Jazireh-ye Jonubi (also Romanized as Jazīreh-ye Jonūbī) is a village in the Rudhaleh Rural District, Rig District, of the Ganaveh County, within the Bushehr Province, Iran. Its name literally translates to “the southern island.” At the time of the 2006 census, its population was 647, within 133 families.

References 

Populated places in Ganaveh County